Thomas Pelham, 1st Baron Pelham of Laughton Bt ( 1653 – 23 February 1712) was a moderate English Whig politician and Member of Parliament for several constituencies. He is best remembered as the father of two British prime ministers (Henry Pelham and the Duke of Newcastle) who, between them, served for 18 years as first minister.

Pelham was born in Laughton, Sussex, the son of Sir John Pelham, 3rd Baronet and his wife Lucy Sidney (daughter of Robert Sidney, 2nd Earl of Leicester). Pelham was educated at Tonbridge School and Christ Church, Oxford.

He sat for East Grinstead from October 1678 until August 1679. In October 1679 he was returned for Lewes, serving until 1702; he subsequently chose to sit for Sussex, a seat he held until 1705.

Personal life
On 26 November 1679 Pelham married Elizabeth Jones, daughter of Sir William Jones, Attorney General from 1650 to 1679 and his wife Elizabeth Alleyn, with whom he had two daughters:
 Hon. Elizabeth Pelham (died 11 May 1711), married Charles Townshend, 2nd Viscount Townshend
 Hon. Lucy Pelham, died unmarried

Pelham's wife Elizabeth died in October 1681. In May 1686, he married Lady Grace Holles (daughter of Gilbert Holles, 3rd Earl of Clare and Grace Pierrepoint), with whom he had two sons and five daughters:
Hon. Grace Pelham (died 1710), married George Naylor
Thomas Pelham-Holles, 1st Duke of Newcastle (1693–1768)
Hon. Henry Pelham (1694–1754)
Hon. Frances Pelham (died 27 June 1756), married Christopher Wandesford, 2nd Viscount Castlecomer
Hon. Gertrude Pelham, married Edmund Polhill
Hon. Lucy Pelham (died 20 July 1736), married Henry Clinton, 7th Earl of Lincoln
Hon. Margaret Pelham (died 23 November 1758), married Sir John Shelley, 4th Baronet

Both of Pelham's sons went on to serve as Prime Minister of the United Kingdom. He served as a Lord Commissioner of the Treasury for three separate periods (March 1690–March 1692; May 1697–June 1699 and March 1701–May 1702); in 1706, he was elevated to the peerage as Baron Pelham of Laughton (having previously succeeded to his father's baronetage in 1703).

References

Sources
 

1653 births
1712 deaths
Barons in the Peerage of England
Peers of England created by Queen Anne
Thomas
English MPs 1661–1679
English MPs 1679
English MPs 1680–1681
English MPs 1681
English MPs 1685–1687
English MPs 1689–1690
English MPs 1690–1695
English MPs 1695–1698
English MPs 1698–1700
English MPs 1701
English MPs 1701–1702
English MPs 1702–1705
Parents of prime ministers of the United Kingdom
Alumni of Christ Church, Oxford
People educated at Tonbridge School
People from Laughton, East Sussex